The 2014–15 season was Morecambe's eighth consecutive season in League Two, the fourth tier of English football.

They began the season on 9 August 2014, with the opening match of their League Two campaign. They also competed in three cup competitions, the FA Cup, the League Cup and the League Trophy. However, they only made it past the First Round in the League Trophy, losing 3–1 away to fellow League Two side Bury in the Second Round on 7 October 2014.

The season ended with a 3–1 home win over Southend United on 2 May 2015, securing an 11th-place finish in the league, the club's highest under Jim Bentley's management.

Competitions

Pre-season and friendlies

League Two

League table

Matches
The fixtures for the 2014–15 season were announced on 18 June 2014 at 9am.

FA Cup

The draw for the first round of the FA Cup was made on 27 October 2014.

League Cup

The draw for the first round was made on 17 June 2014 at 10am. Morecambe were drawn at home to Bradford City.

League Trophy

Transfers

In

Out

Loans in

Loans out

See also
List of Morecambe F.C. seasons

References

Morecambe F.C. seasons
Morecambe